Eliza White may refer to:
 Eliza Jane White, who published as Ida L. White, Irish poet, republican, feminist, atheist, and anarchist
 Eliza White (missionary), Wesleyan Methodist missionary